, abbreviated as , is a 2018 Japanese science fiction monster romance anime television series co-produced by A-1 Pictures and Trigger and animated by Trigger and CloverWorks that premiered in January 2018. The series was announced at Trigger's Anime Expo 2017 panel in July 2017. A manga adaptation by Kentaro Yabuki and another four-panel comic strip manga began serialization in January 2018.

Darling in the Franxx is set in a dystopian future where children are artificially created and indoctrinated solely to defend the remnants of civilization. The story follows a squad of ten pilots, particularly focusing on the partnership between Hiro, a former prodigy, and Zero Two, a hybrid human and elite pilot who aspires to become entirely human.

The animation began international distribution simultaneously upon its domestic release. The streaming service Crunchyroll internationally simulcast the series, with Aniplus Asia simulcasting the series in Southeast Asia. Service partner Funimation began the dubbed release of the series in February 2018.

Synopsis

Setting
Darling in the Franxx takes place in a dystopian post-apocalyptic future where the remnants of human civilization have abandoned the surface. Adults and children exist in contrasting environments from each other. Adults live in technologically advanced cities within Plantations and are immortal, but procreation and relationships among them have become obsolete and undesirable. Artificially-created children, termed "parasites", are deprived of individuality and are educated only for piloting Franxx in pairs to defend humanity. The children are kept in isolation from adult society in environments nicknamed "birdcages", which emulate that of a bygone era so that they can develop the emotional responses required to pilot Franxx.

In the early 21st century, the progress of human civilization was accelerated by ground-breaking discoveries in mining technology, allowing the extraction of magma energy for a new low-cost, all-encompassing energy source. Scientists contributing to the breakthrough form "APE", an organization that would significantly influence world politics and the global economy as a result of their discoveries. After discovering human immortality, much of mankind opted to become immortal despite the side effect of losing their reproductive functions. A cult of personality surrounds Papa, the chairman of the APE, which all humans come to worship akin to a god. Now governing the remnants of civilization, APE leads humanity to abandon Earth's now desolate surface for the relative safety of mobile fortress-cities known as Plantations.

Plot
A male parasite is termed a "stamen", and a female parasite is referred to as a "pistil" (the male and female reproductive parts of a flower, respectively). Parasites are artificially created and have short lifespans.

A team of ten parasites is assigned to the experimental Squad 13 of Plantation 13. One of them, Hiro (Code:016), is a former pilot-candidate prodigy who can no longer synchronize with his partner, and they both fail to complete the training program. While skipping his squad's graduation ceremony, Hiro encounters Zero Two (Code:002), an elite Franxx pilot with klaxosaur blood, red horns, and an infamous reputation as the "Partner Killer". It is rumored that Zero Two's partners are killed after pairing with her by the third time. Shortly after, a Klaxosaur attacks, disrupting Hiro's graduation ceremony and leaving Zero Two's partner killed in action. Despite the rumors, Hiro volunteers to become her new partner, or as Zero Two calls him, her "darling".

Media

Anime

Atsushi Nishigori directed the 24-episode anime series with Nishigori and Naotaka Hayashi handling series composition, Masayoshi Tanaka designing the characters, Shigeto Koyama acting as a mechanical designer, Hiroyuki Imaishi serving as action animation director and Asami Tachibana composing the music. The opening theme song, titled "Kiss of Death", was performed by Mika Nakashima and produced by Hyde, while the ending themes titled  (ep. 1–6),  (ep 7), "Beautiful World" (ep 8-12, 14),  (ep 13), "Escape" (ep 16-20), and "Darling" (ep. 21–23) were performed by XX:me (read as "Kiss Me"), a unit consisting of the series' main female castmembers, Zero Two, Ichigo, Miku, Kokoro, and Ikuno. Crunchyroll simulcast the series, while Funimation has licensed the series, and it was streamed with an English dub. Aniplus Asia simulcast the series in Southeast Asia.

Manga
A manga adaptation written by Code:000, illustrated by Kentaro Yabuki and another four-panel comic strip spinoff manga by Mato started their serialization on the Shōnen Jump+ website on January 14, 2018. The manga adaptation from volume 4 onwards differs significantly from the original anime. As of May 2, 2018, the manga has sold 400,000 copies in Japan.

On July 1, 2021, Seven Seas Entertainment announced they licensed the manga for North American publication.

Mato's four-panel spinoff manga ended on July 11, 2018, and was compiled into a full-color physical book released on October 4, 2018.

Soundtrack

The series' soundtrack is composed by Asami Tachibana and published by Aniplex. The first disc containing 21 tracks is enclosed with the first home video release volume of the anime which was released on April 25, 2018. The second disc also containing 21 tracks is enclosed with the fourth home video release volume which was released on July 25, 2018. The third disc containing 22 tracks is enclosed with the fifth home video release volume which was released on August 29, 2018. All three soundtrack volumes were released digitally on various online music stores on March 27, 2019.

Reception

Critical response

Reception to Darling in the Franxx in English-language media was mixed.  Some reviews praised the large focus of the series on its coming-of-age and romance elements.  Other themes with a more mixed or negative reception involved the heavy sexual innuendos of teenagers, the lack of plot development regarding the alien species VIRM, and the plot twists of the second half of the series, and the rushed pacing of the storyline following episode 15. Eric Van Allen of Kotaku described the series as having "moments of brilliance" with solid work on the early mech fights and the character of Zero Two, but disliked the plot developments in the second half of the series and the ending.  Kyle Rogacion of Goomba Stomp called the series "an endearing character-driven coming-of-age story" but criticized it for having by the end "eschewed everything that made it great and settled for the easy way out". Random Curiosity voiced a more positive opinion to its ending, stating the series will be "well-remembered for seasons to come" and "kept us all fixated and eagerly anticipating every episode set to air".

Awards and nominations
At Newtype Anime Awards 2018, Shigeto Koyama was awarded Best Mechanical Design, with Zero Two and the series itself being runners-up for Best Female Character and Best TV Anime, respectively.

See also
 Neon Genesis Evangelion
 Raxephon
 Diebuster
 Eureka Seven
 Gurren Lagann
 Code Geass
 Gundam Seed
 Gundam Seed Destiny
 Mecha anime and manga

Notes

References

External links

  
 
 Crunchyroll's Darling in the Franxx webpage

Darling in the Franxx
2018 anime television series debuts
2018 manga
Animated television series about extraterrestrial life
Anime with original screenplays
Aniplex franchises
CloverWorks
Coming-of-age anime and manga
Coming-of-age television shows
Crunchyroll anime
Crunchyroll Anime Awards winners
Fiction about memory erasure and alteration
Fiction about reincarnation
Funimation
Japanese webcomics
Rapid human age change in fiction
Romance anime and manga
Seven Seas Entertainment titles
Sexuality in anime and manga
Sexuality in television
Shōnen manga
Shueisha manga
Super robot anime and manga
Studio Trigger
Teenage pregnancy in anime and manga
Teenage pregnancy in television
Tokyo MX original programming
Webcomics in print
Works about child soldiers